Pasgah-e Palis Rah (also Romanized as Pāsgāh-e Palīs Rāh) is a village in Mahan Rural District, Mahan District, Kerman County, Kerman Province, Iran. At the 2006 census, its population was 7, in 6 families.

References 

Populated places in Kerman County